William Lomas (4 July 1885 – 1976) was an English footballer.

He played for Heywood United, Burnley, Bury, Manchester City, York City, Clapton Orient and Tranmere Rovers.

Notes

1885 births
1976 deaths
English footballers
Association football forwards
Burnley F.C. players
Bury F.C. players
Manchester City F.C. players
Leyton Orient F.C. players
Tranmere Rovers F.C. players